Pepsi Arena, Pepsi Centre, or Pepsi Coliseum may refer to:

Pepsi Arena in Quincy, Illinois, the home arena of the Quincy Hawks basketball and volleyball teams
Ball Arena in Denver, Colorado. Formerly known as "Pepsi Center" from 1999 to 2020.
Colisée de Québec in Quebec City, Canada. Formerly known as "Colisée Pepsi" from November 18, 1999 to 2015. 
Corner Brook Civic Centre in Corner Brook, Newfoundland, Canada. Formerly known as "Pepsi Centre".
Pepsi Center WTC in Mexico City, Mexico, located at the World Trade Center Mexico City.
Stadion Wojska Polskiego in Warsaw, Poland. Known as the "Pepsi Arena" from 2011 to 2015
MVP Arena in Albany, New York. Known as the "Pepsi Arena" from 1997 to 2007.
Indiana Farmers Coliseum in Indianapolis, Indiana, located at the Indiana State Fairgrounds. Known as the "Pepsi Coliseum" from 1991 to 2012.
Montreal Forum in Montreal, Quebec. Renovated in 1998 and transformed into an entertainment centre known as the "Pepsi Forum" from 1999 to 2011.
Northtown Center in Amherst, New York (located on the campus of the University at Buffalo). Known as the "Amherst Pepsi Center" from 1999 to 2010.